More Than Robbery is a British thriller television series which originally aired on the BBC in 1958.

Main cast
 Terence Morgan as Durbin 
 Helen Cherry as Norma Tredford 
 Owen Holder as  Morley
 David Horne as  Dr. Nesbitt
 Richard Wordsworth as Tredford
 Patricia Cree as Miss Li
 John Brooking as  Bartrup
 Yah Ming as Willie

References

Bibliography
Baskin, Ellen . Serials on British Television, 1950-1994. Scolar Press, 1996.

External links
 

BBC television dramas
1958 British television series debuts
1958 British television series endings
English-language television shows